The 1926 Canadian federal election was held on September 14, 1926, to elect members of the House of Commons of Canada of the 16th Parliament of Canada. The election was called after an event known as the King–Byng affair.

In the 1925 federal election, Prime Minister William Lyon Mackenzie King's Liberal Party of Canada had won fewer seats in the House of Commons of Canada than the Conservatives of Arthur Meighen. King, however, was determined to continue to govern with the support of the Progressive Party. The combined Liberal and Progressive caucuses gave Mackenzie King a plurality of seats in the House of Commons, and the ability to form a minority government.
The agreement collapsed, however, after a scandal, and King approached the governor-general of Canada, Baron Byng of Vimy, to seek dissolution of the Parliament. Byng refused on the basis that the Conservatives had won the most seats in the prior election and so he called upon Meighen to form a government.

Prime Minister Meighen's government was soon defeated in a vote of non-confidence, and Byng agreed to Meighen's request to dissolve Parliament and call new elections. King effectively campaigned against Byng, instead of against Meighen, in the election and won the most seats in the House of Commons although his party won a smaller proportion of the popular vote than the Conservatives. However, this was largely because the Liberals did not run candidates in all ridings and had an informal electoral pact with the Progressives and Liberal-Progressives. In particular, the election results in Manitoba had Meighen's party capture almost 40 percent of the vote, twice the vote share of any other party, but no seats. Thus, King's Liberals were able to govern with the support of Liberal-Progressive Members of Parliament.

The Progressive Party's Albertan legislators left the party and instead sought re-election under the United Farmers of Alberta banner. At the time, the UFA formed the government in Alberta. They won eleven seats in Alberta, and increase of nine from the previous year and the same number the Progressives won elsewhere. The Progressives' seat count was halved compared to 1925, although when viewed in its totality the election result can also be regarded as a combined net decrease of two seats for the Progressives and UFA.

Byng returned to Britain at the end of the year and was raised to the rank of viscount as an expression of confidence in him. After his party's defeat and the loss of his own seat, Meighen resigned as Conservative leader.

National results 

Notes:

* not applicable - the party was not recognized in the previous election

x - less than 0.005% of the popular vote

Vote and seat summaries

Results by province 
The results in the province of Manitoba are used by supporters of electoral reform as a reason to abolish the "First Past the Post" electoral system. Note that with 40% of the vote, the Conservatives did not win a single seat in the province.

xx - less than 0.05% of the popular vote

See also
 
List of Canadian federal general elections
List of political parties in Canada
16th Canadian Parliament

References

Further reading

External links
Principles vs Puffiness, by J.L. Granatstein

 Federal
1926
September 1926 events